The Lay It On Me Tour was the third major concert tour by Australian singer and songwriter Vance Joy, in support of his first studio album, Dream Your Life Away (2014) and second studio album, Nation of Two (2018). The tour began on 27 September 2017, in Vancouver, Canada and concluded on 15 December 2017 in Indianapolis, Indiana, United States.

Background
Before the tour beginning, Joy performed at several major music festivals, including Sonic Boom Festival in Edmonton, X-Fest in Calgary, CityFolk Festival in Ottawa, Lollapalooza in São Paulo, Buenos Aires, Santiago and Chicago, Splendour in the Grass in Australia, Panorama Music Festival in New York, WayHome Music & Arts Festival in Canada, Mo Pop Festival in Detroit, Festivent Ville de Lévis in Quebec, Osheaga Festival in Montreal, Outside Lands Music and Arts Festival in San Francisco, Alt 98.7 Summer Camp in Long Beach and Festival Pier at Penn's Landing in Philadelphia.

Joy first announced the Australia dates in July 2017. The tour was scheduled to begin on 22 November 2017 in Melbourne, having as opening act the Australian singer Gretta Ray. That same month, Vance announced that he added two dates in London, England. The following month Joy confirmed the dates for the United States and Canada, the tour began on 27 September in Vancouver and would have the Australian singer Amy Shark and American singer Chappell Roan as opening acts during that leg.

Critical response
Lay It On Me Tour received mixed reviews by critics, but they appreciated Joy's connection to his fans and the stories behind each song. Lauren Donelly writing for Vancouver Weekly described that: "Although his vocals were subdued and a touch strained in his higher range, he delivered with power and a winning smile" and "with Joy, in terms of personality and his music, what you see is what you get". Leah Adams from All Access Music commented that: "Vance Joy was in a word, ‘effortless.’ From the very first note to the last, he appeared completely at ease on stage. It was as if he was just playing for a few friends at a party in their living room", however, she rescued that "it was especially endearing to hear all the background stories on the songs and how Vance Joy came up with the ideas to write them".

In a review for Montreal Rocks, Chloe Bol appreciated the show cataloging it as a night with "energy". Shana Jagger of When The Horn Blows appreciated Joy's ability to combine indie folk and pop, which turned out to be "lyrical masterpiece which allowed the audience to visualize the story as it was being sung, making the crowd go crazy as they engage into the music and performance".

Set list
This set list is from the show on 12 October 2017, in Minneapolis. It is not intended to represent all concerts for the tour.

 "Fire and the Flood"
 "From Afar"
 "Wasted Time"
 "Red Eye"
 "Take Your Time"
 "Call If You Need Me"
 "Snaggletooth"
 "Georgia"
 "Like Gold"
 "All Night Long"  / "Sorry" 
 "Lay It on Me"
Encore
 "Mess Is Mine" 
 "Riptide"

Tour

Festivals and other miscellaneous performances
This concert was part of the "Austin City Limits Music Festival"
This concert was part of the "Split Milk Festival"
This concert was part of the "97X Next Big Thing"
This concert was part of the "Live 105's Not So Silent Night"
This concert was part of the "Wrex the Halls"
This concert was part of the "KROQ Almost Acoustic Christmas"

References

2017 concert tours
Vance Joy concert tours